Moges is a male given name of Ethiopian origin that may refer to:

Moges Kebede, Ethiopian writer and publisher
Moges Taye (born 1973), Ethiopian marathon runner
Moges Tadesse (born 1993), Ethiopian international footballer
The meaning of the word Moges is favor (as in Divine favor from God).

See also
Alfred de Moges (1830–1861), French diplomat
Kaghnut, an rural community in Armenia formerly known as Moges

Ethiopian given names
Amharic-language names